Christmas Miracle in Caufield, U.S.A. (also released as The Christmas Coal Mine Miracle) is a 1977 American made-for-television drama film directed by Jud Taylor.

Plot 
Inspired by true events, the plot takes place in 1950 and revolves around Mr. Caufield, the owner of a coal mine. During Christmas, there are several explosions. His employees worry about their health and decide to strike, without any luck. One of the miners, Johnny, is determined to improve the working conditions and wants the other miners to have a great holiday. However, this goes terribly wrong when they are trapped underground following an explosion. Their families are desperate to save them, worrying there might be an even bigger and deadlier explosion.

Cast
Mitchell Ryan as Matthew Sullivan
Kurt Russell as Johnny
Andrew Prine as Arthur
John Carradine as Grampa
Barbara Babcock as Rachel Sullivan
Don Porter as Caufield
Karen Lamm as Matilda Sullian
Melissa Gilbert as Kelly Sullivan
Bill McKinney as Willie

See also
 List of Christmas films

References

External links

1977 television films
1977 films
1970s Christmas drama films
1970s Christmas films
American Christmas drama films
Christmas television films
Films directed by Jud Taylor
Films scored by Fred Karlin
Films set in 1951
Films shot in Montana
Films about mining
NBC network original films
20th Century Fox Television films
American drama television films
1970s American films